Aker Solutions ASA, an engineering company based in Oslo, provides the products, systems and services required to unlock energy from sources such as oil, gas, offshore wind and  capture. The company, founded in 1841, was known as Aker Kværner until 2008. In 2020, the company announced a merger with Kværner ASA

Aker Kværner (OSE: AKVER) was founded in 2004 from the major restructuring of a complex "Aker Kværner" business unit, formed originally in 2002 by the merger of Aker Maritime and Kværner Oil & Gas. On 3 April 2008, Aker Kværner was renamed Aker Solutions, partly due to the difficulty that most non-Scandinavians found in pronouncing "Kværner".

The company was majority controlled by Aker ASA until 2007. Then, via a major ownership restructuring on 22 June 2007, Aker ASA completely gave up its holding in Aker Solutions, and transferred a 40% stake to Aker Holding, which in turn was owned by Aker ASA (60%), the Norwegian Ministry of Trade and Industry (30%), SAAB (7.5%) and Investor AB (2.5%).

History
Aker Solutions is a result of mergers between several Norwegian companies during the 20th century.

Evolution of Aker Kvaerner: 1841 to 2002
The timeline below summarizes the main events leading to the foundation of Aker Kvaerner—from its origins as Aker Mechanical Workshop (1841)—until the merger of Aker Maritime with Kværner Oil & Gas to form Aker Kvaerner (2002).

Timeline
1841: Aker established its first mechanical workshop along the Aker river in Oslo called Aker Mechanical Workshop
1853: Kværner Brug was founded in Oslo.
1922: Kværner Brug began cooperation with Myrens Verksted
1943: Kværner and Myren jointly acquired the majority shareholding in Thunes Mekaniske Verksted.
1960: Kværner Brug's president, Kjell Langballe, was appointed president of all companies within the 'Kværner Group'
1967: Joint holding company Kværner Industries AS was established in December that year, and listed on the Oslo Stock Exchange. The Kværner Group comprised 10 Norwegian companies with 3,200 employees and operating revenues of NOK 385 million. It entered the offshore oil and gas market from its base in Oslo through Kværner Engineering, which was established as an engineering and contracting company in the late 1960s.
1978: Offshore construction work started at Kværner Egersund, and during this period the shipyard in Stavanger was converted into an offshore fabrication facility.
1993: Construction work began at the Guantanamo Bay detention camp through its jointly owned subsidiary, Kværner Process Services Inc. (KPSI), initiating a business partnership with the US Department of Defense that would last until 2006.
1996: Kværner sought to strengthen its engineering base internationally through the acquisition of the UK-based conglomerate, Trafalgar House and became an international player in shipbuilding, oil and gas, pulp and paper and engineering and construction. It moved its international headquarters to London.
1998: Kværner's pulp and paper became a core business area in its own right
1999: The company initiated a major sell-off, focusing on realising capital through divestments. These efforts did not solve the mounting financial and operational challenges, which eventually brought the company into an acute liquidity crisis in August 2001.
2000: In July of that year, Aker Maritime ASA, a Norway-based offshore products, technology and services provider, bought a 26 per cent of the shares in Kværner ASA.
2001: In November of that year, an agreement was reached between Aker Maritime ASA and Kværner ASA. Aker Maritime injected NOK 2.8 bn in net assets, raised another NOK 3.5 bn through two direct issues and renegotiated NOK 8.6 bn of Kværner's debt.
 2002: The Group decided to adopt the Aker Kvaerner brand for the entire Group.

Aker Kværner, and transition to Aker Solutions: 2002 to 2008

Aker Kværner was the result of a merger of Aker Maritime and Kværner Oil & Gas in 2002, and a major restructuring of the Aker Kværner business unit in 2004.

Earlier in 2003, the group structure of Aker Kværner was split into six business areas; Field Development Europe, MMO Europe, Subsea & Oilfield Products, Oil, Gas & Process International, E&C Europe and E&C Americas. A need arose in 2004 to simplify a rather complex group structure which led to the formation of two focused industrial groups: Aker Kværner, specialists within Oil, Gas, Energy and Process; and Aker Yards, specialist shipbuilders. In addition, Aker Kværner became a minor shareholder in the Finnish engineering company Aker Arctic in 2004. The new Aker Kvaerner started trading on Oslo Stock Exchange under ticker symbol 'AKVER' on 2 April 2004.

In 2006, the company's paper/pulp and power businesses were sold to Finnish-based Metso in a deal worth €335 million. On 7 June 2007, an agreement was announced where a 40.1% stake of the company would be sold from Aker ASA to Aker Holding. The new company would be owned by Aker ASA (60%), the Norwegian Ministry of Trade and Industry (30%), SAAB (7.5%) and Investor (2.5%).

In 2007, the company was identified by Amnesty International as an accessory to torture and other human rights abuses for its collaboration in constructing and maintaining the US detention camp at Guantanamo Bay.

Aker Solutions: 2008 to 2020
During the AGM held on 3 April 2008, Aker Kværner announced that it was rebranding as Aker Solutions, referencing the connection with Aker's businesses heritage, but also recognizing that non-Scandinavians find the name Kværner difficult to pronounce. The new company trades under the symbol 'AKSO' on the Oslo stock exchange.

Between April 2010 and June 2010, the company was awarded three contracts by Noble Energy to supply steel tube umbilicals, a complete mono-ethylene glycol (MEG) reclamation unit, and subsea control equipment for the construction of offshore oil platforms in the Tamar gas field in Israel. Together, the contracts were worth NOK 1.1 billion.

However, on 6 May 2011, the Kværner name re-emerged when Aker Solutions' EPC (engineering, procurement and construction) division was rebadged, with the resulting new company being spun off and listed on Oslo Stock Exchange in 2011/Q3. Aker Solutions' holding company – Aker Holdings AS – was also renamed to Aker Kværner Holding AS owning around 40% of Kværner ASA. Aker ASA took over the 10% stake owned by Saab and Investor AB, raising its stake in Aker Kværner Holding AS to 70%.

In 2014, Aker Solutions was further divided to two companies, Aker Solutions and Akastor, then in August Aker Solutions leased the entire first phase of the new Aberdeen International Business Park as part of a consolidation and strengthening of its oilfield services in and around Aberdeen, Scotland.

However, on 18 February 2015, the company announced the loss of around 300 jobs in Norway as a response to falling oil prices and the decline in demand for drilling services.

In November 2020 Aker Solutions merged with Kværner ASA.

See also
Sea Launch
 List of companies
Aker Maritime
Aker Holding

References

External links

2017 Annual Report

 
Oil companies of Norway
Oilfield services companies
Engineering companies of Norway
Shipbuilding companies of Norway
Aker ASA
Companies based in Oslo
Energy companies established in 2008
Manufacturing companies established in 2008
Non-renewable resource companies established in 2008
Norwegian companies established in 2008
Companies listed on the Oslo Stock Exchange